A pulmonary infiltrate is a substance denser than air, such as pus, blood, or protein, which lingers within the parenchyma of the lungs. Pulmonary infiltrates are associated with pneumonia, tuberculosis, and sarcoidosis.

Pulmonary infiltrates can be observed on a chest radiograph.

See also
 Ground-glass opacity
 Pulmonary consolidation

References

Pulmonology